Elaine Goodman Luria (born August 15, 1975) is an American politician and US Navy veteran who served as the U.S. representative from  from 2019 to 2023. Luria's congressional district included most of Hampton Roads, including all of Virginia Beach, Williamsburg, and Poquoson and parts of Norfolk and Hampton. Before running for Congress, she served as a naval officer for 20 years. Luria rose to the rank of commander and spent most of her career aboard ship. She defeated Republican incumbent Scott Taylor in 2018 and was reelected in a rematch against Taylor in 2020, before losing her bid for a third term to Republican Jen Kiggans in 2022.

Early life, education, and military service
Luria was born on August 15, 1975, in Birmingham, Alabama. Her mother Michelle's family immigrated to Jasper, Alabama, in 1906. The family sold goods to coal miners in Walker County, Alabama. In the early-1900s, Luria's great-grandfather helped establish a Reform Jewish congregation in Jasper, and her immediate family joined the Temple Emanu-El in Birmingham. Luria's mother and grandmother were active in the National Council of Jewish Women (of which her mother was president), Hadassah, the Temple Emanu-El Sisterhood, and the Birmingham Jewish Federation.

Luria graduated from Indian Springs School in 1993. She graduated from the United States Naval Academy in 1997 with a Bachelor of Science (BS), with a double major in physics and history and a minor in French. In 2000, Luria attended the United States Naval Nuclear Power School. While serving in the Navy and stationed aboard the flagship , she earned a Master of Science (MS) degree in engineering management from Old Dominion University in 2004.

Luria served as a naval officer for 20 years, operating nuclear reactors as an engineer, where she rose to the rank of commander. Luria was among the first female American sailors to spend her entire career on combat ships. She commanded Assault Craft Unit TWO, a combat-ready unit of 400 sailors, from 2014 until her retirement in 2017. She held a Passover seder on an aircraft carrier after 9/11.

As of 2019, Luria's service was the longest active-duty tenure of any current member of the House Democratic Caucus.

U.S. House of Representatives

Elections

2018 

In the June 10 Democratic primary, she garnered 62% of the vote, defeating Karen Mallard, who received 38%.

In the general election, Luria defeated Republican incumbent Scott Taylor with 51% of the vote to Taylor's 49%. She carried six of the district's nine county-level jurisdictions, including all but one of the district's five independent cities. She also carried Taylor's hometown of Virginia Beach.

2020 

Luria ran for reelection. She defeated Taylor in a rematch with 51% of the vote. As in 2018, Luria carried six of the district's nine county-level jurisdictions, including all but one independent city. She was likely helped by Joe Biden carrying the district; notably, Biden carried Virginia Beach, the first Democrat to do so since 1964.

2022 

Luria ran for reelection in 2022. Facing a difficult path to victory as a Democrat in a competitive district, she focused her campaign on defense policy and refrained from highlighting Biden's $1.5 trillion Build Back Better spending plan, for which she voted. Luria lost the election to Jen Kiggans.

Tenure
Luria was sworn in on January 3, 2019. She was one of 102 female members elected to the United States House of Representatives in 2018, a record number. She joined two other female veterans in that class, fellow Naval Academy graduate Mikie Sherrill and former Air Force officer Chrissy Houlahan.

Virginia's 2nd congressional district is centered on Hampton Roads. It includes all of Poquoson, Virginia Beach, and Williamsburg cities and York County in Hampton Roads; parts of Norfolk and Hampton cities and James City County in Hampton Roads; and all of Accomack and Northampton counties on the Eastern Shore.

On Veterans Day 2019, Luria released a video announcing her support for an impeachment inquiry into President Donald Trump, which The Washington Post called "an unusual move for a moderate on the cusp of a tough reelection."

During Trump's presidency, Luria voted in line with his stated position 11% of the time. As of June 2022 she had voted in line with Joe Biden's stated position 98.2% of the time.

Investigation into the January 6 U.S. Capitol attack 

Luria was one of the original members appointed to the Select Committee to Investigate the January 6 Attack on the United States Capitol in 2021. She and Representative Adam Kinzinger co-led the eighth public hearing in July 2022. This hearing focused on Trump's inaction during the 187 minutes from the end of his speech to his Rose Garden speech, where he told the rioters, "We love you, you're very special". Luria introduced the full video of both speeches. She also showed outtakes from Trump's January 7, 2021, statement titled "Remarks on National Healing". Luria said of these remarks that this "was not the message of condemnation and just punishment for those who broke the law that we expect from a president whose oath and duty is to ensure the laws are faithfully executed. But instead, It was his newest version of 'Stand Back and Stand By'." In her closing statement, she said, "This is not, as it may appear, a story of inaction in a time of crisis, but instead it was the final action of Donald Trump's own plan to usurp the will of the American people and remain in power. Not until it was clear that his effort to violently disrupt or delay the counting of the election results had failed did he send his message—a message to his supporters in which he commiserated with their pain and he told them affectionately to go home."

On July 25, 2022, Luria posted on her Twitter account the original script of Trump's January 7 remarks and edits he made to it in which he had crossed out any references to DOJ action and condemnation was heavily toned down.

Political positions

Defense
Luria was the lone Democrat to vote against repealing the Authorization for Use of Military Force Against Iraq Resolution of 2002 in 2021.

Domestic policy
While the federal government was in a partial shutdown, Luria said that she had asked for her salary to be withheld until federal workers were paid in January 2019. She participated in a bipartisan group of representatives seeking to broker a compromise to end the shutdown.

In February 2019, Luria introduced the Veterans' Compensation Cost-of-Living Adjustment Act of 2019, which increased the cost of living adjustments (COLAs) made to veterans. It earned bipartisan support and passed in September 2019.

Foreign policy
Luria is a self-described "unabashed supporter" of the U.S. relationship with Israel.

Immigration
Luria was listed as one of 60 House Democrats who expressed support for some kind of physical barrier on the border in January 2019.

Impeachment
In September 2019, Luria labeled herself a "security Democrat"—an idiom for freshman Democrats with national security experience—and called for an impeachment inquiry against Trump in a Washington Post op-ed. In an October 2019 town hall meeting in Virginia Beach, Luria charged that Trump had "Enlist[ed] the help of a foreign leader to influence and malign a potential political opponent to affect the outcome of our next election all under [the] guise of trying to fight corruption." Later in October 2019, Luria formally voted for an impeachment inquiry against Trump, and joined all but three House Democrats to vote for impeachment on both counts: abuse of power and obstruction of Congress in December 2019; all House Republicans voted no on both charges.

Environment
Luria accepts the scientific consensus on climate change and is concerned about the physical impacts of climate change on global instability and military readiness. She also believes the Trump administration attempted to discredit military and scientific experts on the physical impacts of climate change, which she views as an aspersion to the national security and scientific apparatuses.

Stock trades
Luria opposes proposed legislation that would ban lawmakers from trading stocks, calling the efforts "bullshit".

Gun policy
Luria favors instituting red flag laws and universal background checks on all gun purchases.

In 2022, Luria voted for H.R. 1808: Assault Weapons Ban of 2022.

Corporate donations
In her 2018 campaign, Luria pledged not to accept donations from political action committees (PACs). She was consequently endorsed by End Citizens United, a group that seeks to reform campaign finance laws and reduce the role of corporate money in politics. In 2020, Luria accepted $34,000 in corporate PAC contributions from the PACs of a tobacco company and defense contractors, among others. PolitiFact rated Luria's decision to accept corporate PAC funding a "Full Flop." End Citizens United expressed disappointment in Luria's reversal.

Committee assignments
Committee on Armed Services (vice chair)
Subcommittee on Seapower and Projection Forces
Subcommittee on Readiness
Committee on Veterans' Affairs
Subcommittee on Disability Assistance and Memorial Affairs (chair)
Subcommittee on Oversight and Investigations
Committee on Homeland Security
Subcommittee on Transportation and Maritime Security
 Select Committee on the January 6 Attack

Caucus memberships 

 New Democrat Coalition
Problem Solvers Caucus

Electoral history

Post-congressional career
In February 2023, Luria launched the Defend Democracy PAC, a political action committee to support electing Democrats to the Virginia General Assembly.

Personal life
Luria's husband, Robert Blondin, is also a retired naval commander and spent 27 years in the service. Luria has two stepchildren and a daughter born in 2009. The family resides in Norfolk, and she gave the commencement speech in May 2019 at Virginia Wesleyan University. Luria attends Ohef Sholom Temple, a Reform Jewish synagogue in Norfolk.

See also
 Women in the United States House of Representatives
 List of Jewish members of the United States Congress

References

External links

|-

1975 births
21st-century American Jews
21st-century American politicians
21st-century American women politicians
American Jews from Virginia
American military engineers
American nuclear engineers
American women engineers
Democratic Party members of the United States House of Representatives from Virginia
Female members of the United States House of Representatives
Indian Springs School alumni
Jewish American military personnel
Jewish American people in Virginia politics
Jewish members of the United States House of Representatives
Jewish women politicians
Living people
Military personnel from Norfolk, Virginia
People from Birmingham, Alabama
Politicians from Norfolk, Virginia
United States Naval Academy alumni
United States Navy officers
Women in Virginia politics